The Olmecas de Tabasco (English: Tabasco Olmecs) are a professional baseball team in the Mexican League based in Villahermosa, Tabasco, Mexico. Their home ballpark is the Estadio Centenario 27 de Febrero.  

The Olmecas won their only Mexican League championship in 1993 under manager Juan Navarrete. The Olmecas have long been known for their pitching, especially Emigdio Lopez, Tabasco Cecilio Ruiz, Juan Jesus Alvarez, Jesus "Chito" Rios, Ricardo Osuna, and Gaudencio Aguirre. Other well-known players who have played for the Olmecas include catcher Elisha Garzón, first baseman Jay Gainer, second baseman Joel Serna, third baseman Manuel Ramirez, and shortstop Heber Gomez. Rusty Tillman, Oscar Zambrano, Rosario Zambrano, Arturo Bernal, and Tabasco Carlos Sievers have all been stars in the outfield in Villahermosa.

The Olmecas began playing in the Mexican League in 1975 and have had many nicknames over the years: Cardenales de Tabasco (1975), the Plataneros de Tabasco (1977–85), and the Ganaderos de Tabasco (1985–89). They became the Olmecas in 1990. In 1998, they played as the Ganaderos for two seasons before returning to the Olmecas name for the 2000 season.

History
The Cardenales, the first team representing Villahermosa in the Mexican League, began play in 1975. Plagued with economic problems, they sat out the 1976 season before returning to the league in 1977.

When the club returned to play in 1977, they were renamed the Plataneros (the Banana Planters), a name they kept until 1985. The Plataneros found their first success in 1979, when they qualified for the playoffs under manager Raúl Cano. The team included Arturo Bernal, Rommel Canada, Joel Orquendo, and Nike Nagy. As the 1980s began, the Plataneros signed stars Luis Tiant and Jesus Sommers but did not find success on the field.

In 1984, Julian Manzur, the club president, decided to sell the team. Humberto Tapia purchased the club and changed their name to the Ganaderos for 1985. In 1987, they signed Steve Howe, who was attempting a return to the major leagues after a drug suspension. He had great success and was signed by the Texas Rangers after 13 games.

Mike Cole stole 100 bases in the 1989 season and there was hope of a playoff appearance, but poor road trips against Campeche and Yucatán to end the season left them out of the postseason picture.

In 1993 Juan Navarrete took over as manager and the club signed many foreign players including Rafael de Lima, Alexis Infante, Rusty Tillman, and Todd Brown. The Olmecas ended a 14-year playoff drought and won the Mexican League title. Don Diego Rosillo was named Executive of the Year and Ricardo Osuna won Pitcher of the Year.

Roster

References

External links
  

Baseball teams established in 1975
Mexican League teams
1975 establishments in Mexico
Sports teams in Tabasco